Albert Horne is a South African-born chorus master and orchestral conductor, whose focus is opera chorus preparation and operatic performances. He worked for the Cape Town Opera and has been chorus master and conductor at the Hessisches Staatstheater Wiesbaden since 2014.

Career 
Born in Cape Town, South Africa, Horne studied at the South African College of Music in Cape Town and at the Guildhall School of Music and Drama in London. He was the chorus master and conductor of the Cape Town Opera from 2007 to 2014. In 2013, the chorus was awarded “Opera Chorus of the Year” at the International Opera Awards in London.

In 2012, Horne prepared the chorus for Simon Rattle's concert performances of Gershwin's Porgy and Bess at the Philharmonie with the Berlin Philharmonic. He has conducted orchestras such as the Munich Symphony Orchestra, the Orchestra Victoria in Melbourne, the Hessisches Staatsorchester in Wiesbaden and the Orchestre Pasdeloup at the Théâtre du Châtelet in Paris. He also conducted performances in the opera houses of Bordeaux, Cardiff, Malmö, Tel Aviv and at London's ENO. In a performance of the Internationale Maifestspiele Wiesbaden, he conducted Gershwin's Porgy and Bess with the chorus of the Cape Town Opera and the orchestra of the Hessisches Staatstheater Wiesbaden in a production which was regarded as one of the best contributions of the year's festival because of its authenticity.

Horne has been chorus master and conductor at the Hessisches Staatstheater Wiesbaden since the start of the 2014/15 season, where he is responsible for the preparation of the opera chorus, and also conducted productions of Bernstein's Candide, Puccini's Madama Butterfly and La Bohème, as well as Mussorgsky's Boris Godunov. In 2017, he conducted and also prepared the chorus for Britten's Peter Grimes, staged by Philipp M. Krenn. He also conducted the World Premiere of Søren Nils Eichberg's new opera, Schönerland, the Wiesbaden premiere of Tim Plegge's ballet Liliom with the Hessisches Staatsballet, as well as a symphony concert with the Hessisches Staatsorchester. In 2018 he also conducted the Landesjugendorchester Rheinland-Pfalz on tour in Germany, South Africa and Botswana. He returned to the podium in 2019 to conduct Mark-Anthony Turnage's Anna Nicole and the revival of Britten's Peter Grimes in Wiesbaden, an orchestral concert with the Rheinische Orchesterakademie Mainz, as well as several concerts with the Münchner Symphoniker in the Gasteig and the Prinzregententheater in Munich. On 1 May 2022, he conducted the Wiesbaden premiere of Widmann's Babylon as the opening piece of the 2022 Internationale Maifestspiele Wiesbaden. A concert of the Hessisches Staatsorchester, with a program including Janáček's Glagolitic Mass in the Kurhaus is scheduled for 2022.

Horne has performed as vocal accompanist in various concert halls in Europe, South Africa, USA and Australia, with recent recital performances at the Helsingborg Konserthus and at the Conservatoire à Rayonnement Régional d'Aubervilliers in Paris.

References

External links 
 Albert Horne Operabase
 Claus Ambrosius: "Candide" in Wiesbaden: Die beste aller Operetten des Broadways Rhein-Zeitung 4 November 2014
 Axel Zibulski: Hübsch anzuschauen – "Madama Butterfly" feiert als Übernahme aus Darmstadt Premiere Wiesbadener Kurier 22 February 2016

South African conductors (music)
Choral conductors
Living people
Alumni of the Guildhall School of Music and Drama
21st-century conductors (music)
1980 births